Leopold "Pol" Demeuter (9 May 1904 – 2 July 1934) was a Belgian motorcycle racer.

Career 
Demeuter began his racing career in 1926. After initial success, he became professional and was hired by the motorcycle manufacturer Rush. In 1929, he became a factory-backed rider for the Saroléa company and had immediate success. At the beginning of 1930, he had a big accident which put him out of action for the rest of the year.

For the 1932 season, Demeuter moved to FN, but his first year with them was not very successful. In 1933, Demeuter achieved three victories on 500 cc motorcycles including the Circuit de Floreffe and the Grand Trophy de l'Entre-Sambre-et-Meuse in Mettet.

Demeuter started the 1934 season with four wins. In the 500 cc class he won races in Mettet and Floreffe, the Grand Prix des Frontières in Chimay and the Belgian Championship at Spa-Francorchamps. Demeuter's fifth win of the season was the Dutch TT, which for 1934 carried the European Championship title and so Demeuter became European Champion in the 500 cc class. Demeuter won ahead of teammate and fellow Belgian, Erik Haps, who raced under the pseudonym, "Noir".

The following weekend, Demeuter entered the German Grand Prix, held at the circuit in Hohenstein-Ernstthal. During the race, Erik "Noir" Haps and Gunnar Kalén lost their lives in separate accidents. Later, Demeuter lost control of his bike on oil and crashed. His injuries were not believed to be serious and he was taken to a nearby hospital. It was discovered that he had severe leg injuries and necessitated the amputation of both legs. Demeuter's condition rapidly deteriorated and he died the following morning.

References

External links 
 Demeuter's entry at MotorsportMemorial.org

1904 births
1934 deaths
Belgian motorcycle racers
Motorcycle racers who died while racing
Sport deaths in Germany
People from Ganshoren
Sportspeople from Brussels